The men's 4 × 10 kilometre relay cross-country skiing event was part of the cross-country skiing programme at the 1964 Winter Olympics, in Innsbruck, Austria. The competition was held on 8 February 1964, at the Cross Country Skiing Stadium.

Results

References

Men's 4 x 10 kilometre relay
Men's 4 × 10 kilometre relay cross-country skiing at the Winter Olympics